In mathematics, a rate is the ratio between two related quantities in different units. If the denominator of the ratio is expressed as a single unit of one of these quantities, and if it is assumed that this quantity can be changed systematically (i.e., is an independent variable), then the numerator of the ratio expresses the corresponding rate of change in the other (dependent) variable.  

One common type of rate is "per unit of time", such as speed, heart rate, and flux. Ratios that have a non-time denominator include exchange rates, literacy rates, and electric field (in volts per meter).

In describing the units of a rate, the word "per" is used to separate the units of the two measurements used to calculate the rate (for example a heart rate is expressed as "beats per minute"). A rate defined using two numbers of the same units (such as tax rates) or counts (such as literacy rate) will result in a dimensionless quantity, which can be expressed as a percentage (for example, the global literacy rate in 1998 was 80%), fraction, or multiple.

Often rate is a synonym of rhythm or frequency, a count per second (i.e., hertz); e.g., radio frequencies, heart rates, or sample rates.

Introduction

Rates and ratios often vary with time, location, particular element (or subset) of a set of objects, etc. Thus they are often mathematical functions.

A rate (or ratio) may often be thought of as an output-input ratio, benefit-cost ratio, all considered in the broad sense. For example, miles per hour in transportation is the output (or benefit) in terms of miles of travel, which one gets from spending an hour (a cost in time) of traveling (at this velocity).

A set of sequential indices may be used to enumerate elements (or subsets) of a set of ratios under study. For example, in finance, one could define I by assigning consecutive integers to companies, to political subdivisions (such as states), to different investments, etc. The reason for using indices I is so a set of ratios (i=0, N) can be used in an equation to calculate a function of the rates such as an average of a set of ratios. For example, the average velocity found from the set of v I 's mentioned above. Finding averages may involve using weighted averages and possibly using the harmonic mean.

A ratio r=a/b has both a numerator "a" and a denominator "b". The value of a and b may be a real number or integer. The inverse of a ratio r is 1/r = b/a. A rate may be equivalently expressed as an inverse of its value if the ratio of its units is also inverse. For example, 5 miles (mi) per kilowatt-hour (kWh) corresponds to 1/5 kWh/mi (or 200 Wh/mi).

Rates are relevant to many aspects of everyday life. For example:
How fast are you driving? The speed of the car (often expressed in miles per hour) is a rate. What interest does your savings account pay you? The amount of interest paid per year is a rate.

Rate of change
Consider the case where the numerator  of a rate is a function  where  happens to be the denominator of the rate .
 
where f(x) is the function with respect to x over the interval from a to a+h. An instantaneous rate of change is equivalent to a derivative.

For example, the average speed of a car can be calculated using the total distance traveled between two points, divided by the travel time. In contrast, the instantaneous velocity can be determined by viewing a speedometer.

Temporal rates

In chemistry and physics:
 Speed, the rate of change of position, or the change of position per unit of time
 Acceleration, the rate of change in speed, or the change in speed per unit of time
 Power, the rate of doing work, or the amount of energy transferred per unit time
 Frequency, the number of occurrences of a repeating event per unit of time
 Angular frequency and rotation speed, the number of turns per unit of time
 Reaction rate, the speed at which chemical reactions occur
 Volumetric flow rate, the volume of fluid which passes through a given surface per unit of time; e.g., cubic meters per second

Counts-per-time rates

 Radioactive decay, the amount of radioactive material in which one nucleus decays per second, measured in becquerels

In computing:
 Bit rate, the number of bits that are conveyed or processed by a computer per unit of time
 Symbol rate, the number of symbol changes (signaling events) made to the transmission medium per second
 Sampling rate, the number of samples (signal measurements) per second

Miscellaneous definitions:
 Rate of reinforcement, number of reinforcements per unit of time, usually per minute
 Heart rate, usually measured in beats per minute

Economics/finance rates/ratios
 Exchange rate, how much one currency is worth in terms of the other
 Inflation rate, the ratio of the change in the general price level during a year to the starting price level
 Interest rate, the price a borrower pays for the use of the money they do not own (ratio of payment to amount borrowed)
 Price–earnings ratio, market price per share of stock divided by annual earnings per share
 Rate of return, the ratio of money gained or lost on an investment relative to the amount of money invested
 Tax rate, the tax amount divided by the taxable income
 Unemployment rate, the ratio of the number of people who are unemployed to the number in the labor force 
 Wage rate, the amount paid for working a given amount of time (or doing a standard amount of accomplished work) (ratio of payment to time)

Other rates
 Birth rate, and mortality rate, the number of births or deaths scaled to the size of that population, per unit of time
 Literacy rate, the proportion of the population over age fifteen that can read and write
 Sex ratio or gender ratio, the ratio of males to females in a population

See also
 Derivative
 Gradient
 Hertz
 Slope

References

Measurement
 

de:Rate